The 2010 Thüringen Rundfahrt der Frauen was the 23rd edition of the Thüringen Rundfahrt der Frauen, a women's cycling stage race in Germany. It was part of the 2010 women's road cycling season. It was rated by the UCI as a category 2.1 race and was held between 20 and 25 July 2010.

Stages

Stage 1
20 July – Altenburg to Altenburg,

Stage 2
21 July – Gera to Gera,

Stage 3
22 July – Greiz to Greiz,

Stage 4
23 July – Schleiz to Schleiz,  (Individual time trial)

Stage 5
24 July – Schmölln to Schmölln,

Stage 6
25 July – Schmölln to Schmölln,

Final classification

Source

See also
 2010 in women's road cycling

References

External links

2010 in women's road cycling
Thüringen Rundfahrt der Frauen
2010 in German sport
July 2010 sports events in Germany